Amasa Learned (Pro-Administration) was elected September 19, 1791 in  to finish the term of Roger Sherman (Pro-Administration).  Sherman had been re-elected in 1790, but resigned June 13, 1791 to become U.S. Senator.

Connecticut 1791 At-large
Connecticut 1791 At-large
1791 At-large
Connecticut At-large
United States House of Representatives At-large
United States House of Representatives 1791 At-large